NDV may refer to:

 Newcastle disease virus, the virus that causes Newcastle disease
 Niger Delta Vigilante, an armed militia group in the Niger Delta
 Number of Distinct Values, a metric useful in determining density estimation, especially when working with histograms or when selecting the optimal indexing strategy in a relational database
 Nick D'Virgilio, progressive rock drummer
 Nyck de Vries, Dutch racing driver, Formula E champion